, Tricholoma matsutake, is a species of choice edible mycorrhizal mushroom that grows in East Asia, northern Europe, and North America. It is prized in Japanese cuisine for its distinct spicy-aromatic odor.

Etymology
The common name and specific epitaph, matsutake, in use since the late 19th century, derives from Japanese matsu (pine tree) and take  (mushroom).

Habitat and distribution
Matsutake mushrooms grow in East Asia, Southeast Asia (Bhutan and Laos), parts of Europe such as Estonia, Finland, Norway, Poland, Sweden, and along the Pacific coasts of Canada and the United States.

Matsutake mushrooms grow under trees and are usually concealed under litter on the forest floor, forming a symbiotic relationship with roots of various tree species. In Korea and Japan, matsutake mushrooms are most commonly associated with Pinus densiflora. In China, matsutake is mainly distributed in the northeast and southwest regions. In the northeast, the growth of matsutake depends on the Pinus densiflora, its distribution is the same as that of Pinus densiflora. Longjing City, Jilin Province, China is known as the "Hometown of Matsutake". "天佛指山/Tianfozhi Mountain" in Longjing has been approved as a national nature reserve by the State Council of China. This is the first nature reserve for a edible mushroom and its ecosystem in China.

Similar species
In Japan, several closely related species have been found, including Tricholoma bakamatsutake (baka-matsutake - stupid matsutake in Japanese), Tricholoma fulvocastaneum (nise-matsutake - fake matsutake), and Tricholoma robustum (matsutake-modoki - imitation of matsutake). Of those species, only baka-matsutake has a taste similar to that of matsutake. Both baka-matsutake and nise-matsutake grow in Fagaceae forests, while matsutake-modoki grows in the same pine forests as the genuine matsutake.

In the North American Pacific Northwest, Tricholoma murrillianum is found in coniferous forests of one or more of the following tree species: western hemlock, Douglas fir, Noble fir, Shasta red fir, Sugar pine, Ponderosa pine, or Lodgepole pine. In California and parts of Oregon, it is also associated with hardwoods, including Tanoak, Madrone, Rhododendron, Salal, and Manzanita. In northeastern North America, the closely related mushroom Tricholoma magnivelare is generally found in Jack pine forests. A report published in 2000 indicated that Tricholoma nauseosum and matsutake (T. matsutake) are the same species.

Cost and availability
Matsutake are hard to find because of their specific growth requirements, the rarity of appropriate forest and terrain, and competition from wild animals such as squirrels, rabbits, and deer for the once-yearly harvest of mushrooms. Domestic production of matsutake in Japan has also been sharply reduced over the last 50 years due to the pine-killing nematode Bursaphelenchus xylophilus, and the annual harvest of matsutake in Japan is now less than 1,000 tons, with the Japanese mushroom supply largely made up by imports from China, Korea, the Pacific Northwest, British Columbia, and northern Europe.

See also
 Himematsutake: the "princess matsutake"
 List of Tricholoma species
 Medicinal fungi
 The Mushroom at the End of the World by Anna Tsing

References

External links

East Asian cuisine
Edible fungi
Japanese cuisine terms
Non-timber forest products
matsutake